{{DISPLAYTITLE:C23H33NO2}}
The molecular formula C23H33NO2 may refer to:

 Azastene, a steroidogenesis inhibitor
 Cyanoketone, a synthetic androstane steroid and a steroidogenesis inhibitor
 NE-100, a selective sigma-1 receptor antagonist
 Xipranolol, a beta blocker